WSET may refer to:

 WSET-TV, a TV channel based in Lynchburg-Roanoke, Virginia
 Wine & Spirit Education Trust, an organisation based in London, UK